Posala was a town of ancient Lycaonia, inhabited in Byzantine times. 

Its site is located near , Kazımkarabekir, Asiatic Turkey.

References

Populated places in ancient Lycaonia
Former populated places in Turkey
Populated places of the Byzantine Empire
History of Karaman Province